Danilo Pustinjaković (Serbian Cyrillic: Данило Пустињаковић; born 12 March 1977) is a Serbian former professional footballer who played as a goalkeeper.

After starting out at his hometown club Proleter Zrenjanin, Pustinjaković represented numerous domestic and international sides, including Čukarički, Pandurii Târgu Jiu, Banat Zrenjanin, Jagodina, Makedonija Gjorče Petrov, Napredak Kruševac, Novi Pazar, Radnički Kragujevac, Mladost Lučani, Kolubara, and Dolina Padina.

External links
 
 
 
 

Association football goalkeepers
CS Pandurii Târgu Jiu players
Expatriate footballers in Romania
Expatriate footballers in North Macedonia
First League of Serbia and Montenegro players
FK Banat Zrenjanin players
FK Čukarički players
FK Dolina Padina players
FK Jagodina players
FK Kolubara players
FK Makedonija Gjorče Petrov players
FK Mladost Lučani players
FK Napredak Kruševac players
FK Novi Pazar players
FK Proleter Zrenjanin players
FK Radnički 1923 players
Liga I players
Serbian expatriate footballers
Serbian expatriate sportspeople in Romania
Serbian expatriate sportspeople in North Macedonia
Serbian First League players
Serbian footballers
Serbian SuperLiga players
Sportspeople from Zrenjanin
1977 births
Living people